The 2013 Prairie View A&M Panthers football team represents Prairie View A&M University in the 2013 NCAA Division I FCS football season. The Panthers are led by third year head coach Heishma Northern and playetheir home games at Edward L. Blackshear Field. They are a member of the West Division of the Southwestern Athletic Conference (SWAC).

Media
All Prairie View A&M games will be carried live on KPVU 91.3 FM.

Schedule

^Game aired on a tape delayed basis

Game summaries

Texas Southern

Sources:

Texas State

Sources:

Southern

Sources:

Alabama A&M

Sources:

Stephen F. Austin

Sources:

Grambling State

Sources:

Alabama State

Sources:

Mississippi Valley State

Sources:

Jackson State

Sources:

Alcorn State

Sources:

Abilene Christian

Sources:

Arkansas–Pine Bluff

Sources:

References

Prairie View AandM
Prairie View A&M Panthers football seasons
Prairie View AandM Panthers football